Adam James Harold Holloway (born 29 July 1965) is a British Conservative Party politician who has been the Member of Parliament (MP) for Gravesham since 2005. He served as Government Whip from September to October 2022, and as Assistant Government Whip from July to September 2022. He previously served on the Home Affairs Select Committee and as a member of the Defence Select Committee, and Science and Technology Select Committee. He also served for a time as Deputy Chairman of the Conservative Middle East Council. He has been a vocal supporter of pro-Brexit lobby group Leave Means Leave.

Before he was a Member of Parliament, he served in the British Army's Grenadier Guards for five years, serving in Iraq and Germany. After serving in the army he was a reporter for ITN and ITV where he produced the award-winning programme "No Fixed Abode" (1991), in which he spent three months homeless on the streets of London.

Early life and career
Holloway was born in Faversham, Kent, the son of the Revd Roger Holloway OBE (died 2010). He was privately educated at Cranleigh School. He then spent his gap year with the Afghan Resistance, during the Soviet-Afghan War, before going to Magdalene College, Cambridge, where he studied social and political sciences, with his degree promoted by tradition to an MA. He completed an MBA at Imperial College London.

After graduating from university, Holloway attended the Royal Military Academy, Sandhurst, from which he was commissioned into the British Army's Grenadier Guards in 1987. During his five-year military career, he saw service with the British Army on the Rhine as an Armoured Infantry platoon officer, and as a captain in Iraq during the Persian Gulf War.

Career in journalism 
After resigning from the Army in 1991 with the rank of captain, Holloway worked as an investigative journalist and reporter with ITN and ITV.

With ITV, he produced an award-winning documentary series for the ITV programme World in Action, called "No Fixed Abode" (1991). In this series he locked access to his bank account and "slept rough" on the streets of London, for three months, in order to shed light on the difficulties experienced by the city's homeless, particularly those who are mentally ill. In his series Disguises, also for ITV, he went undercover with the victims of ethnic cleansing in the Balkans and passed himself off as a homeless schizophrenic living in various English cities. With ITN Holloway was in Sarajevo for a long period during the siege as their Bosnian correspondent. Holloway was also with News at 10, where, as the lead investigator, he exposed a Filipino child prostitution ring by posing as a paedophile.

His other journalistic work includes living in the Sangatte refugee camp in Calais while pretending to be an economic migrant and being a war reporter in Iraq alongside Marie Colvin of The Sunday Times.

Parliamentary career
Holloway was elected in the 2005 general election to represent the Kent constituency of Gravesham, defeating a former Labour minister, Chris Pond, by just 654 votes, but with one of the largest swings from Labour to Conservative in the country at 4.9% at that general election.  This was the first time since the Second World War that Gravesham (or its predecessor Gravesend constituency) had not been held by the party of Government.

He delivered his maiden speech in the House of Commons on 28 June 2005. Holloway was also invited to speak (on 15 September 2006) alongside US Congressman John Shimkus to students on the campus of Southern Illinois University Edwardsville (SIUE).

Holloway was a member of the Defence Select Committee from 2006 to 2010, and then again from November 2012 to November 2014. He also served for a time as Deputy Chairman of the Conservative Middle East Council. In Parliament, he has additionally been a member of the Science and Technology Committee, the Public Administration and Constitutional Affairs Committee, the Foreign Affairs Committee and the Public Administration Committee

In a 2009 report written by Holloway, he described how some of the claims about Iraq having weapons of mass destruction, used to support the UK government's case for war in 2003, originated from an Iraqi taxi driver. Particularly the claim about their ability to be "ready to launch in 45 minutes," which was one of the "central planks" of the government's case. According to Holloway, the unreliability of some sources was not expressed by MI6 while preparing the case for war because of pressure from Downing Street.

He was criticised in the local media in May 2009 for having the highest expenses claims in North Kent, but argued his claims were legitimate. In the wake of the Westminster parliamentary expenses scandal in 2009, Holloway was ordered by Sir Thomas Legg, the head of a committee examining abuse of expenses by Members of Parliament, to repay £1,000 to the Exchequer which he had over-claimed. In July 2009, he was criticised by a local newspaper after he responded to a request for an interview about his plans for the summer recess with an expletive laden rejection. This came after all the other local MPs had given answers to the newspapers questions.

Holloway was returned as MP for Gravesham at the general election of 6 May 2010 with 22,956 votes (48.5% of the vote) and with an increased majority of 9,312.

In October 2010 he was appointed as Parliamentary Private Secretary (PPS) to David Lidington, Minister of State for Europe and NATO in the Foreign and Commonwealth Office. In October 2011, he resigned this post when he was asked to vote against a non-binding Backbench Motion offering the British people a referendum on Europe. When speaking about his decision he said: "I'm not now prepared to go back on my words to my constituents and I'm really staggered that loyal people like me have actually been put in this position," considering that he had "never voted against the party line." For this decision he received 'Backbencher of the Year' in The Spectator Parliamentarian of the Year Awards in 2011 as an MP who "in a choice between career and principle, chose principle."

While in Parliament, Holloway has taken a close interest in the War in Afghanistan and has visited, at his own expense, about a dozen times. In 2009 he wrote a paper for the Centre for Policy Studies titled "In Blood Stepp'd in too Far" which outlined the policies that he thought should be implemented during the War in Afghanistan: establishing an "honest government," ensuring that "tribal structures are supported, and "maintaining low levels of allied troops."

Holloway has also spent time in Iraq at the frontline with the Islamic State, and on his own has visited Mosul. In October 2014 he was one of just six Conservative MPs to vote against air strikes targeting Islamic State in Iraq. He argued the campaign hadn't "been thought through". He actively abstained in the vote for air strikes in Syria in November 2015.

Holloway was re-elected in 2015 general election with a majority of 8,370.

In a September 2015 Parliamentary speech Holloway described giving asylum to refugees from the Middle East as "bonkers", stating than many asylum seekers go on holiday in the countries they had fled from and used his barber as an example. His barber, a Kurdish refugee, subsequently stated that he was holidaying in Great Yarmouth that week, not Iraq.

Holloway publicly supported the United Kingdom's withdrawal from the European Union in the 2016 United Kingdom European Union membership referendum. He was also one of the 'Tory rebels' who voted to keep no-deal on the table. Holloway also was one of the very first to write a letter of no-confidence in Theresa May's leadership during her Brexit negotiations and was one of the 28 so-called 'Brexit Spartans' who voted against her deal when it was presented for a third time in March 2019.

He was criticised by political rivals in June 2017 after he was seen campaigning with Janice Atkinson, a former UKIP MEP, who had been suspended from her former party after a fraud enquiry was started relating to her expenses, and who had subsequently become vice-president of Marine Le Pen's far-right European Parliament grouping. He was re-elected with a majority of 9,347.

As Chairman of the All Party Parliamentary Group on drones, Holloway provided an article to PoliticsHome and was interviewed about drones on BBC Radio 5 Live on 17 July 2018.

In April 2018, Holloway said in Parliament that sleeping rough is "a lot more comfortable" than military exercises and that the majority of rough sleepers were "foreign nationals", in a debate on tackling street homelessness. After being criticised by rival politicians, Holloway defended his position during the debate by pointing to his personal experience of being in the army and having spent several months sleeping on the streets as part of a television programme.

In the 2019 general election he was re-elected with a majority 15,581, almost doubling his majority.

In 2020, he was appointed Parliamentary Private Secretary to Ministry of Housing, Communities and Local Government Secretary of State Robert Jenrick.

During the COVID-19 pandemic, Holloway set up 'Gravesham Community Support' to encourage people to become 'Super Neighbours', in order to pool resources, and to support and help their neighbours.

In July 2021, Holloway was one of five Conservative MPs found by the Commons Select Committee on Standards to have breached the code of conduct by writing to the Lord Chief Justice to try to influence a judge not to release character statements made by ordinary members of the public – former constituents of the former Conservative MP Charlie Elphicke, who had previously been found guilty of three counts of sexual assault and sentenced to two years in prison. On 22 July 2021, Holloway made a personal statement in the House of Commons apologising.

In February 2022, Holloway visited Ukraine following the Russian invasion of the country. The trip was criticised by Downing Street who had advised against travel to the country; Holloway said the trip would improve his ability to represent constituents and he intended to stay in the country for a few days.

In April 2022, it was revealed that Holloway provided a character statement which was used as part of the defence case in the trial of former Conservative MP Imran Ahmad Khan, who was found guilty of sexually assaulting a 15-year-old boy.

References

External links
 Holloway's official website
 
 Profile on the Conservative Party website
 Debrett's People of Today

Living people
People from Faversham
People educated at Cranleigh School
Alumni of Imperial College London
Alumni of Magdalene College, Cambridge
Grenadier Guards officers
British Army personnel of the Gulf War
ITN newsreaders and journalists
Conservative Party (UK) MPs for English constituencies
UK MPs 2005–2010
UK MPs 2010–2015
UK MPs 2015–2017
UK MPs 2017–2019
UK MPs 2019–present
1965 births